Paul-Aimé Sauriol (3 September 1931 – September 22, 2010) was a Canadian engineer and business executive.

Life and career
Sauriol was born in Laval, Quebec, Canada, the son of a farmer.  He graduated with a degree in civil engineering from the École Polytechnique de Montréal in 1955. Two years later, he founded the engineering firm Desjardins + Sauriol, which is now known as Dessau, alongside business partner Jean-Claude Desjardins. Today, what once began as a two-man engineering consultancy employs 4,800 people and is one of the largest engineering-construction companies in Canada.

Sauriol was the recipient of several notable awards, including the 1997 Josef-Hode-Keyser Award for his contributions to Quebec's transportation sector, and the 1998 Dunamis Award for his contributions to the City of Laval's economic development. In 2004, Sauriol received the Jean-Jacques Archambault Award, the most prestigious award in Quebec's electrical industry.

Following a long battle with cancer, he died in Laval on September 22, 2010, at age 79.

References

1931 births
2010 deaths
Canadian civil engineers
Businesspeople from Quebec
People from Laval, Quebec
Université de Montréal alumni
French Quebecers
Deaths from cancer in Quebec